Andriyashin (masculine) or Andriyashina (feminine) is a Russian last name, a variant of Adrianov.

People with the last name
Nikita Andriyashin, 2006 Samsung Global Scholarship Program recipient

References

Notes

Sources
И. М. Ганжина (I. M. Ganzhina). "Словарь современных русских фамилий" (Dictionary of Modern Russian Last Names). Москва, 2001. 

Russian-language surnames